Datuk Jaujan bin Sambakong is a Malaysian politician who has been the State Minister of Housing and Local Government. He has served as the Member of Sabah State Legislative Assembly (MLA) for Sulabayan since 2013. He is a member of the Heritage Party (WARISAN). He was a member of the United Malays National Organisation (UMNO) until he quitted in 2016.

Election results

Honours 
  :
  Knight Companion of the Order of the Crown of Pahang (DIMP) - Dato' (2009)
  :
  Commander of the Order of Kinabalu (PGDK) - Datuk (2018)

References

Malaysian politicians
Living people
Year of birth missing (living people)
Former United Malays National Organisation politicians
Sabah Heritage Party politicians